Oskar Aichinger is an Austrian avant-garde jazz pianist from Vöcklabruck, who has lived in Vienna since 1984.

He first came to attention in Vienna in the early 1990s, working with bass clarinetist Hans Steiner. He has since collaborated with musicians such as Stefan Németh, Franz Koglmann, Hannes Enzlberger, Steinaich Irrding, Burkhard Stangl, Oswald Eggers, Achim Tang and Paul Skrepek, among many others. Together with Kristine Tornquist he wrote the opera "Das Totenschiff", which premiered in 2018.

He also wrote the book "Ich bleib in der Stadt und verreise".

Discography

References

External links
 Official website

Austrian jazz pianists
Living people
Avant-garde jazz pianists
21st-century pianists
Year of birth missing (living people)